Electron beam texturing (EBT) is a technology used to apply roughness to the surface of rolling mill cylinders by impinging the surface of these cylinders with a modulated electron beam. The beam locally melts the surface of the cylinder, producing crater-like depressions.

The technology was originally developed by the German company Linotype-Hell for application in the printing industry, but eventually found its successful application in the metal rolling industry, where it is competing with alternative texturing technologies, such as electrodischarge texturing.

Electron beams in manufacturing
Metal forming